Steyerbromelia plowmanii is a plant species in the genus Steyerbromelia. This species is endemic to Venezuela.

References

plowmanii
Flora of Venezuela